Hoosier is an unincorporated hamlet in Antelope Park Rural Municipality No. 322, Saskatchewan, Canada. The hamlet is approximately 40 km north west of the Town of Kindersley at the intersection of Highway 317 and Highway 772. The Canadian Pacific Railway played a big role in the town's economy when it was completed in 1913, in the early years of Hoosier's history. Due to the closure of a branch line in 1981, the tracks from Dodsland to Hoosier were pulled and the last of the community's grain elevators was demolished, causing Hoosier's population to decline.

See also
 List of communities in Saskatchewan
 Hamlets of Saskatchewan
 Hoosier United Church (historic building located in the Hamlet of Hoosier)

References

Antelope Park No. 322, Saskatchewan
Unincorporated communities in Saskatchewan
Ghost towns in Saskatchewan
Division No. 13, Saskatchewan